"Back Street Luv" is a song by British rock band Curved Air, written by band members Ian Eyre, Sonja Kristina and Darryl Way. It was included on the Second Album and released as a single in July 1971 by Warner Bros. Records. It reached number 4 in the UK Singles Chart on 18 September. Warners also released it as a single in the Netherlands, Germany, France and Portugal. In 1975 a considerably more intense live version appeared on Curved Air – Live and was released as a single in the UK by Deram, but it failed to make any commercial impact.

Rock critic Dave Thompson called "Back Street Luv" "one of the band's own finest moments" and "also one of the crucial singles of the early 1970s".

In 1997, Salad covered the song on the Childline charity album.

Track list

Personnel

Original studio version
 Sonja Kristina — vocals
 Francis Monkman — EMS VCS 3, Hohner pianet, guitar, Hammond organ
 Ian Eyre — bass
 Florian Pilkington-Miksa — drums

(Darryl Way, though the chief writer of the song's music, does not play on the original recording.)

Live version from Curved Air - Live, 1975
 Darryl Way — VCS3, electric piano
 Sonja Kristina — vocal
 Phil Kohn — bass
 Florian Pilkington-Miksa — drums
 Francis Monkman — guitar, organ

Live version from Alive, 1990
 Darryl Way — synthesizers, backing vocal
 Sonja Kristina — lead vocal
 Florian Pilkington-Miksa — drums
 Francis Monkman — guitar, bass

Editions 
 1971 — Second Album (3:36, WEA International
 1971 — Second Album (5:56, Collectors' Choice Music)
 1975 — Live (3:47, Repertoire)
 1976 — Best of Curved Air (Warner Bros.)
 1994 — Progression (Alex Records)
 1995 — Journey to the Edge: Progressive Rock Classics (3:35, Music Collection)
 1995 — The No. 1 70’s Rock Album (3:40 Alex)
 1995 — Progressive Pop: Inside the 70’s (3:50, See For Miles Records)
 1999 — Rock Festival (Insight)
 2000 — Alive, 1990 (4:26, Mystic Records)
 2006 — Absolute 70’s (Crimson Productions)
 2006 — Classic Rock Presents Prog Rock (3:37, Gut-Active)
 2006 — Good Morning Vietnam 2 (3:50, Disky)
 2006 — My Sounds Rock (Disky)
 2007 — Head Full of Rock (3:36, EMI)
 2007 — The Prog Rock Album (3:38, Crimson Productions)
 2007 — The Sound of the 70s (3:35, Warner Strategic Marketing)
 2008 — The Best of Curved Air (Repertoire)
 2008 — Legendary Rock (3:48, MP Records)
 2010 — The Old Grey Whistle Test (3:33, Rhino)

References

1971 singles
Curved Air songs
1971 songs
Warner Records singles